Datuk Mohmad Shaid bin Mohd Taufek (born 16 July 1947) is a Malaysian public servant who served as the 6th Mayor of Kuala Lumpur.

Honours 

 Commander of the Order of Meritorious Service (P.J.N.) - Datuk (2001)

References 

Mayors of Kuala Lumpur
Commanders of the Order of Meritorious Service
1947 births
Living people